Jur Jadeh (also Romanized as Jūr Jādeh) is a village in Banaft Rural District, Dodangeh District, Sari County, Mazandaran Province, Iran. At the 2006 census, its population was 181, in 54 families.

References 

Populated places in Sari County